Muhammad Karam Shah al-Azhari (1 July 1918 – 7 April 1998) was an Islamic scholar of Hanafi jurisprudence, Sufi, and Muslim leader. He is known for his magnum opus, Tafsir Zia ul Quran fi Tafsir ul Quran, meaning “The light of the Quran in the Exegesis of the Quran." It is commonly referred to as Diya ul Quran or Zia ul Quran. He also authored Zia un Nabi, or “Diya al-Nabi," Life of Prophet Muhammad, a detailed biography of Muhammad in seven volumes.

He was associated with Sunni Barelvi movement and was the spiritual guide and pir of the Chishtiyya Sufi order.

Early life and career
Muhammad Karam Shah was born on 1 July 1918 at Bhera, Sargodha District, British India. He finished his basic education in his hometown Bhera in 1936. Then he learned Persian and Arabic languages. Then on the advice of Khwaja Qamar ul Din Sialvi (1906 – 1981), he went to Muradabad, in 1942 for the study of hadith. He graduated from the University of the Punjab in 1945 and then went on to Egypt for higher religious education at Al-Azhar University. He received his master's degree in Islamic Law.

He is known for being the author of the book "Zia un Nabi", a 1995 Urdu biography of prophet Muhammad. The worj is 7 Volumes. Later, it was translated into English by Muhammad Qayyum Awan also in seven volumes . He is recognised for writing Tafsir Zia ul Quran, an Urdu interpretation of the Quran in 5 volumes.

He reorganized the Islamic institution Dar al Ulum Muhammadiyyah Ghausiyyah established by his father in Bhera and brought major changes in the syllabi of religious education. He was of the view that modern education also should be learned along with religious education.

Karam Shah al-Azhari was an active participant in the Pakistan movement and vigorously campaigned in the Indian provincial elections, 1946 for All India Muslim League.

He also served as a justice on the Supreme Court of Pakistan until his death in 1998 and had served on its Shariat Bench. He became a justice of the Federal Shariat Court, when it was first established in 1981.

Bibliography
Tafsir Zia ul Quran (1995) (in five volumes)
Zia un Nabi (1995) (a detailed biography of prophet Muhammad in seven volumes)

Awards and recognition
Sitara-e-Imtiaz (Star of Excellence) by the Government of Pakistan
Pakistan Post Office issued a commemorative postage stamp to honor him in its 'Men of Letters' stamp series (2004)

Death
Muhammad Karam Shah al-Azhari died on 7 April 1998 after being ill for nearly a year.

References

External links
Muhammad Karam Shah al-Azhari's book on goodreads.com website
Profile of Muhammad Karam Shah al-Azhari on dmgbhera.net website 

1918 births
1998 deaths
Pakistani judges
Pakistani scholars
Recipients of Sitara-i-Imtiaz
Sharia judges
Al-Azhar University alumni
Cairo University alumni
Pakistani Sunni Muslim scholars of Islam
People from Sargodha District
University of the Punjab alumni
Barelvis
Pakistan Movement activists
Justices of the Supreme Court of Pakistan
Translators of the Quran into Urdu
20th-century translators